is a Japanese superhero manga series written and illustrated by Hirofumi Neda. It is a spin-off to Kōhei Horikoshi's main manga series My Hero Academia. It was serialized on Shueisha's online platform Shōnen Jump+ from November 2015 to November 2017, with its chapters collected in five tankōbon volumes.

Publication

My Hero Academia: Smash!! is written and illustrated by Hirofumi Neda. It was serialized on Shueisha's online platform Shōnen Jump+ from November 9, 2015, to November 6, 2017. Shueisha collected its chapters in five tankōbon volumes, released from April 4, 2016, to November 2, 2017.

In North America, the manga is licensed for English release by Viz Media. Viz Media published the five volumes between August 6, 2019, and August 4, 2020.

Reception
Brandon Daniel from The Fandom Post praised the series for being a great way to unwind from the more intense moments of the main series.

References

External links
 

My Hero Academia
Comedy anime and manga
Comics spin-offs
School life in anime and manga
Shueisha manga
Shōnen manga
Superheroes in anime and manga
Superhero schools
Viz Media manga